The 1913 Victorian Football Association season was the 37th season of the Australian rules football competition. The premiership was won by the Footscray Football Club, after it defeated  by one point in the final on 6 September. It was the club's fifth VFA premiership.

Premiership 
The home-and-home season was played over eighteen rounds, with each club playing the others twice; then, the top four clubs contested a finals series under the amended Argus system to determine the premiers for the season.

Ladder

Finals

Notable events 
 On June 9, Melbourne City lost to Port Melbourne despite having thirteen more scoring shots, by the score 4.24 (48) def. by 8.7 (55). The seven-point loss was the closest Melbourne City came to winning a match in its two years in the Association.

External links 
 Victorian Football Association/Victorian Football League history (1877–2008)
 List of VFA/VFL Premiers (1877–2007)

References 

Victorian Football League seasons
VFL